Bonny Gas Transport is a subsidiary of Nigeria LNG or NLNG which itself is an incorporated joint-venture of Nigerian National Petroleum Corporation (NNPC), Shell Gas B.V., TotalEnergies Gaz & Electricite Holdings and Eni International N.A. N. V. S.àr.l. It owns and operates a number of LNG tankers.

The company
Bonny Gas Transport Limited, initially named Enellengee Limited,​​ was incorporated in 1989​ following the incorporation of Nigeria LNG Limited (NLNG), to provide shipping capacity for NLNG. BGT owns and operates LNG tankers that transport NLNG’s products to its buyers. The Company is owned by NLNG and its shareholders.

Activities
BGT was set up 1989 by Nigeria LNG Limited (NLNG) to transport all LNG gas produced by NLNG to customers.

Fleet
The website Helderline provides an overview of 13 of these ships.

Fleetlist
, the company owned and operated the following LNG carriers:

Sources and references

Shell plc subsidiaries
Shipping companies of Nigeria
Transport companies established in 1989
Gas shipping companies
Tanker shipping companies